Martin Alphonzo Wood (born June 2, 1958) is an American former professional basketball player who played in six National Basketball Association (NBA) seasons for four teams: the Atlanta Hawks, San Diego Clippers, Seattle SuperSonics and Dallas Mavericks. A  All-American from the University of North Carolina, Wood was selected by the Hawks in the first round (4th pick overall) of the 1981 NBA draft.

At North Carolina, he averaged 16 points a game, averaged 5 rebounds a game and shot 56 percent from the field.

In his NBA career, Wood played in 417 games and scored 4,902 points. His best year as a professional came during the 1985–86 season as a member of the SuperSonics, appearing in 80 games and averaging 15.0 ppg.

External links
 
 College stats at Sports Reference
 Professional stats at Basketball Reference
 Al's Ministry

1958 births
Living people
21st-century African-American people
African-American basketball players
All-American college men's basketball players
American expatriate basketball people in France
American expatriate basketball people in Italy
American men's basketball players
Atlanta Hawks draft picks
Atlanta Hawks players
Basket Mestre 1958 players
Basketball players from Georgia (U.S. state)
Dallas Mavericks players
FC Mulhouse Basket players
McDonald's High School All-Americans
North Carolina Tar Heels men's basketball players
Omaha Racers players
Parade High School All-Americans (boys' basketball)
People from Gray, Georgia
San Diego Clippers players
Seattle SuperSonics players
Shooting guards
Small forwards
20th-century African-American sportspeople